The Abbeville Opera House, also known as the Abbeville Opera House and Municipal Office Building is an historic building located in Abbeville, South Carolina. Designed by William Augustus Edwards of Edwards and Wilson, it was opened in 1904 and dedicated in 1908. On July 1, 1970, it was added to the National Register of Historic Places.

According to the South Carolina Department of Parks, Recreation and Tourism the theater has received the South Carolina Governor's Travel Award for Tourism and was designated as the Official Rural Drama State Theatre of South Carolina. It is included in the Abbeville Historic District.

History

At the turn of the 20th century there were many "road companies" producing shows in New York City. Once the production was assembled, the show traveled throughout the country.  One of the more popular tours went from New York to Richmond to Atlanta.  For a number of years, Abbeville was an overnight stop for the entire touring company.  Several members of the community decided that if this area had a facility, since the travelling companies were coming through the area anyway, Abbeville could sponsor some of these touring productions.

On October 1, 1908, what was then the Abbeville District dedicated a new Abbeville County Courthouse and City Hall.  The grand old theatre now known as the Abbeville Opera House was a part of that splendid pair of buildings "equal in beauty of architecture and modern conveniences of any in the state," according to regional newspaper accounts of the day.  From that time on, all the "greats and near greats" played on the magnificent Opera House stage.  Vaudeville was in its "heyday" as was Abbeville and the Abbeville Opera House.

Today, most people who visit the historic Abbeville Opera House see a building that
represents a microcosm of the history of Abbeville since the turn-of-the-century.  Efforts toward preservation and renewal of Abbeville and the renewal of 
the Abbeville Opera House began some thirty years ago. The refurbished theatre operates year-round.  The 
218 newly refurbished seats face a  stage.  The balcony has
92 seats and the turn of the 20th century boxes seat up to 6 people in each of the
four box seats.

References

External links

 Abbeville Opera House
 Greater Abbeville Information Network
 South Carolina Department of Archives and History page on Abbeville Opera House

Theatres on the National Register of Historic Places in South Carolina
Buildings and structures in Abbeville County, South Carolina
William Augustus Edwards buildings
Theatres in South Carolina
Tourist attractions in Abbeville County, South Carolina
National Register of Historic Places in Abbeville County, South Carolina
Opera houses on the National Register of Historic Places
Event venues on the National Register of Historic Places in South Carolina
Opera houses in South Carolina